Allen House, also known historically as The Terraces, is an historic house at 2 Solomont Way on the South Campus of the University of Massachusetts Lowell in Lowell, Massachusetts.  Built about 1854, it is one of the city's finest early examples of Italianate architecture. In the early 20th century, it was the home of Charles Herbert Allen, a prominent local politician.  Since 1957, it has been owned by the University of Massachusetts Lowell; restored in the 2000s, it houses a gallery and event space used for university programs and is home to the university's Honors College. It was listed on the National Register of Historic Places in 1982.

Description and history
Allen House stands on the UMass Lowell South Campus. It is set on a rise above the Merrimack River, of which it has commanding views.  It is an irregularly massed and somewhat rambling brick building,  stories in height, with a gabled roof.  The gable ends are adorned with cloverleaf windows and there is brick drop ornamentation along the eaves.  Some windows are set in round-arch openings.  A bracketed Italianate porch is found on the front (east) side, and a Colonial Revival porch extends across part of the west side.

The house was built in the early 1860s as the mansion house of Rollin White, who invented a type of rear-loading revolver.  White worked for Samuel Colt in Hartford, Connecticut for many years before moving to Lowell and establishing his own firearms company, later the Lowell Arms Company.  The house was later the home of Charles Herbert Allen, a politician prominent in state politics and the first civilian U.S. governor of Puerto Rico.

See also
National Register of Historic Places listings in Lowell, Massachusetts

References

Houses on the National Register of Historic Places in Middlesex County, Massachusetts
Houses in Lowell, Massachusetts
University of Massachusetts Lowell
Italianate architecture in Massachusetts
National Register of Historic Places in Lowell, Massachusetts